Lucio Francisco Cárdenas (1898 – death unknown) was a Cuban catcher in the Negro leagues in the 1920s. 

A native of Havana, Cuba, Cárdenas made his Negro leagues debut in 1924 with the Cuban Stars (East). He played four seasons with the Stars through 1927.

References

External links
 and Seamheads

1898 births
Date of birth missing
Year of death missing
Place of death missing
Cuban Stars (East) players
Baseball catchers
Baseball players from Havana
Cuban expatriates in the United States